Elophila africalis is a moth in the family Crambidae. It was described by George Hampson in 1906. It is found in Angola, Benin, Botswana, Cameroon, the Democratic Republic of the Congo, Ghana, Ivory Coast, Kenya, Madagascar, Malawi, Mozambique, Namibia, Niger, Nigeria, Senegal, Sierra Leone, South Africa, Tanzania, Uganda, Zambia and Zimbabwe.

The wingspan is 12–16 mm for males and 16–22 mm for females. The forewings are dull orange brown with a whitish subbasal and median fascia. The postmedian and subterminal fasciae are also whitish, but mixed with fuscous. The termen is dull orange. The base of the hindwings is dull orange and the postmedian area is dull orange with dark fuscous scales. Adults are on wing in February and from April to November, probably in continuous generations.

The larvae feed on Azolla and Vossia species.

References

Acentropinae
Moths described in 1906
Moths of Africa
Aquatic insects